John Robert "Jay" Ashcroft (born July 12, 1973) is an American attorney, engineer and politician serving as the 40th and current Secretary of State of Missouri since 2017. A member of the Republican Party, he is the son of former U.S. Attorney General John Ashcroft.

As Missouri Secretary of State, Ashcroft pushed for stricter voter identification laws, meant to prevent voter fraud and supported an investigation into Missouri Attorney General Josh Hawley.

Early life
Ashcroft is the son of politician John Ashcroft.

Ashcroft attended the United States Merchant Marine Academy, but did not graduate. He earned his Bachelor of Science and Master of Science degrees from Missouri University of Science and Technology. He then worked as an engineer. Ashcroft attended law school, earning his Juris Doctor from Saint Louis University.

Political career

Ashcroft ran for the Missouri Senate in 2014, losing to Jill Schupp. He ran for Missouri Secretary of State in the 2016 election, defeating state senator Will Kraus in the Republican primary election and former KMOV anchor Robin Smith in the general election. In 2020, Ashcroft won re-election against Democrat Yinka Faleti.

Elections 
Ashcroft is a staunch supporter of stricter voter ID laws. Ashcroft's claims about voter fraud, as well as the need for photo ID laws to combat voter fraud, were a central aspect of his 2016 campaign for the office of Missouri Secretary of State. He has asserted that voter fraud is common enough to have "changed elections." Election fraud did change the outcome in a Kansas City election when an aunt and uncle voted illegally for a state representative who won by one vote. The type of voter fraud that would be addressed through Ashcroft's preferred legislation, which critics say suppresses turnout, is extremely rare. In defending a push for stricter photo-ID laws, Ashcroft cited one instance where a couple illegally voted, but omitted that the photo-ID laws that Ashcroft was advocating for would not have prevented the couple from voting. According to the Kansas City Star, "there has never been a reported case of voter impersonation fraud in Missouri." In June 2018, Ashcroft said that voter fraud was "an exponentially greater threat than hacking." 

On July 3, 2017, Ashcroft said that he would comply with a request by the Presidential Advisory Commission on Election Integrity, a commission appointed by Trump to investigate supposed voter fraud, to a request for Missourians voting data. At the time, Missouri was one of only three states to comply with the commission - which was required by Missouri law. Officials of both parties in many states declined to turn over data to the commission, variously citing voter privacy and stating that the commission would legitimize Trump's claims of massive voter fraud. He said he would give out voters’ names, addresses, birthdates, where they voted and when, also required by Missouri law.

Ashcroft has backed a number of Republican proposals to reduce the number of Missouri ballot initiative petitions and make it harder for ballot initiatives to win approval in elections.

In March 2023, Ashcroft announced that he is withdrawing Missouri from Electronic Registration Information Center, a bipartisan system to update and improve the accuracy of voter rolls.

Investigation of Josh Hawley
In December 2018, Ashcroft, who as Secretary of State does not have the power to issue subpoenas, asked Missouri State Auditor Nicole Galloway, who can issue subpoenas, to cooperate in an investigation into then-Missouri Attorney General Josh Hawley for using public resources in his successful 2018 campaign for the U.S. Senate. In February 2019, Ashcroft ended his investigation into Hawley, declaring that there was no evidence that Hawley or the AG's office had violated election law.

Opposition to Medicaid expansion 
After Missouri voters voted in favor of Medicaid expansion, Ashcroft applauded efforts by Republicans in the Missouri legislature to block funding for Medicaid expansion.

Library censorship 
As Secretary of State in 2022, Ashcroft proposed restrictions on materials available to minors in public libraries. The proposal details procedures and processes each library would be required to implement in order to continue receiving state funding. More than 10,000 comments were submitted in the 30-day public comment period, and library industry leaders and associations voiced their opposition. In response to backlash, Ashcroft described the proposed rules as a move toward "local control" and said "I'm not the one making a big deal about this. It's the libraries."

Electoral history

State Senate

Secretary of State

References

External links 

 

1973 births
Living people
21st-century American politicians
Missouri lawyers
Missouri Republicans
Missouri University of Science and Technology alumni
Politicians from St. Louis County, Missouri
Saint Louis University School of Law alumni
Secretaries of State of Missouri
United States Merchant Marine Academy alumni